Vanessa Noel (born October 12, 1961) is an American shoe designer, hotelier, gallery owner, and philanthropist.

Biography
Vanessa Noel was born and raised in Bryn Mawr, Pennsylvania. Noel was able to make social connections early in life as her mother was friends with Grace Kelly. She was presented at the Philadelphia Charity Ball in Philadelphia, PA, and the International Debutante Ball in New York, NY. 

She attended the Agnes Irwin School in Rosemont, PA and Cornell University in New York, where she was a member of the sorority Kappa Kappa Gamma and graduated with a degree in Fine Arts and Architecture. After graduation, she moved to New York City and launched her first shoe line in 1987.

In 2015, Vanessa Noel spoke at the Women in the World Annual Summit along with Barbra Streisand, Jennifer Ashton, and Dr. Holly Anderson to discuss heart disease and the gender bias in medicine.

She currently serves on the board of Hanover Charities, sits on the council of Oceana, serves on the advisory board of the White Heron Theatre Company, and is the Vice Chairman on the board of Round Hill Hotel and Villas Jamaica.

Career

Designer

Early in her career, Noel was known to draw the inspiration for her shoes from her architectural background, and has said, “I view my shoes as sensual art objects. I create them to be both an individual sculpture and a natural, elegant extension of a woman’s leg.” Her shoes have been considered works of art and were included in exhibits at the Metropolitan Museum of Art in New York City and the Rheinnisches Landesmuseum in Bonn, Germany. Her designs are also in the permanent collection at the Museum of Fine Arts in Boston, MA.

Noel is the sole designer for her label. She regularly travels to Italy, India and Kashmir. to work with various artisans. The shoes she produces use products only from Italian tanneries. These tanneries create exotic skins and furs such as sable, python, and alligator. She also supports the organic and free trade industries, using eco-friendly materials. Her collections are all handcrafted in Milan, Italy, with each style produced in limited editions.

In 1988, she designed a pair of satin pumps encrusted with 177.85 carats of rubies, which she sold in her store for $15,000. The Vanessa Noel label also encompasses bridal shoes, men's footwear, cashmere shawls, and other accessories.

In 2004, Noel debuted the stretch alligator boots that became her signature. The boots appeared on Kim Cattrall in the Sex and the City movie in 2008.

In 2015, Vanessa Noel launched her first handbag collection and her first fragrance named Stiletto in the form of a scented candle.

Vanessa Noel's shoes have appeared in Sex And The City the movie, Oprah, the Martha Stewart show, NBC News, music videos for Mary J. Blige and Janet Jackson, and many fashion magazines. Her footwear products have also been used in the runway shows of Nicole Miller, Rebecca Moses, Chadwick Bell, Keith Lissner, Ralph Lauren and Ralph Rucci's shows in both Paris and New York.

Noel has developed a loyal following of socialites, celebrities, and style makers since her launch in 1987, such as Princess Michael of Kent who most recently wore Vanessa Noel pumps to the royal wedding of Prince William and Kate Middleton in the spring of 2011,

Business
In October 1987, Noel simultaneously launched her fashion label and her first boutique on East 66th Street and Madison Avenue, across the street from Imelda Marcos'’ old townhouse. Her label was an immediate success and in 1990 she was asked to join the Council of Fashion Designers of America (CFDA) with recommendation letters written by Carolina Herrera, Carolyn Roehm and the CFDA director at the time Fern Mallis.

Noel introduced her couture bridal collection in 1990, which was sold in her own boutique as well as Bergdorf Goodman and Neiman Marcus. Shortly after the collection's launch, Noel designed a pair of shoes for Mariah Carey's wedding to Tommy Mottola in 1993. Noel's bridal collection was extremely well-received, and Vera Wang asked Noel to do her first collection of bridal shoes as well.

In 1994 Noel opened her second boutique in Nantucket, Massachusetts where she spend childhood summers, and her boutique was the first New York boutique to open a location on Nantucket Island.

In 1998 Noel designed a collection for C.Z. Guest, inspired by Guest's love of gardening. The limited-edition CZ by Vanessa Noel collection was sold at Bergdorf Goodman and Neiman Marcus stores.

Noel opened her flagship boutique on East 64th Street in October 2004. She designed the nearly 2,000 square foot space herself.

Vanessa Noel Hotel
In the summer of 2002 Noel became the first American designer to own her own hotel with the launch of the Vanessa Noel Hotel. Also, the first boutique hotel in Nantucket, the VNH is home to a Vanessa Noel shoe boutique and the Café V bar, where Noel titled the menu “How to Look Good in Your Shoes” and offered high-end wellness food.

Vanessa Noel Hotel Green
Noel opened her second hotel, Nantucket's first, and still only as of 2013, environmentally conscious organic boutique hotel, the Vanessa Noel Hotel Green. The Hotel Green uses organic linen bedding, recycled Frank Gehry-designed cardboard chairs and coffee tables, hemp bath linens, Anna Sova milk paint, eco-friendly cleaning products and ayurvedic bath products.

Seven Seas Gallery
Noel also opened the Seven Seas Gallery across the street from her two hotels in 2005. The art gallery opens for two months every year, July and August. Noel describes her gallery as “a cultural anthology depicted through art, literature, photography, fashion, furniture and sculpture.” The Seven Seas immediately became a destination for decorators, and art collectors and Nantucket locals.

Vanessa Noel is the sole owner of Vanessa Noel Couture, the Vanessa Noel Hotel, Vanessa Noel Hotel Green, Café V, and the Seven Seas Gallery.

Philanthropy
Hanover Charities

In the years 2005, 2010, 2012, and 2017 she chaired the Hanover Charities Sugarcane Ball, a fundraising event that is held annually at Round Hill in Jamaica. In 2017, Vanessa Noel, along with Hanover Charities, helped raise a record amount of $474,360 to assist individuals and institutions in the parish. She also holds a Jamaican-themed fundraising event in her shoe boutique before the Sugarcane Ball to raise money for Hanover Charities.

Oceana

Noel became an Oceana Council member in 2010 and regularly chairs fundraising events to benefit the organization. Noel also designed a special edition Oceana shoe that was auctioned on Charitybuzz with proceeds benefiting the organization.

Kipton Art Foundation

In 2010 she became a Vice Council Member of the Kipton Art Foundation, which works to provide artists with stipends to produce their work and to promote up and coming artists.

Other charitable contributions include:
 The Princess Grace Foundation
 Community Research Institute "Heart & Soul" Benefit Committee Member (1990)
 The Fashion Center NYC Bid for Kids Designer Committee Member (1997)
 VP of the East 64th Street Block Association (2009)
 Fair Fund (2009)
 Bailey's & Clothes Off Our Backs (2009)
 Philabunndance (2011) Noel donated proceeds from sales following her talk at the Brown Brothers Harris Women's Forum.
 Recipient of The Salute To Style Award benefiting the Madison Square Boys & Girl's Club (2017)
 Designed a one of a kind jacket for the DIFFA Dallas auction (2017)

TV appearances
Vanessa Noel has appeared on the following television shows:
 Rachael Ray $40 A Day (February 4, 2005)
 The Oprah Winfrey Show, Vanessa Noel endorsed by Oprah Winfrey
 The Martha Stewart Show (Date ? & January 2011)
 Plum TV (Date ? & July 28, 2010)
 The Today Show
 Fox Business
 Backstage Hollywood
 The Real Housewives of New York (2011, 2015, 2017)
 Seeking Solutions with Susan (2011)
 Oprah: Where Are They Now? (2016)
 The Face (2013)
 Open House (2016)
 CBS News (2016)

Books
Vanessa Noel was featured in the following books:
 Designers On Instagram: #fashion (2015)
 IMPACT: 50 Years of the Council of Fashion Designers of America (2012)
 Silver Girl (2011)
 American Fashion Travel (2011)
 American Fashion Designers at Home (2010)
 Caribbean Hideaways (2010)
 American Fashion Accessories (2008)
 Hip Hotels (2003)
 Nantucket Nights (2002)
 The Business of Bliss (1999)
 Zagat Shopping NYC

References

External links
 Vanessa Noel My Site
 Vanessa Noel Hotel Home
 Vanessa Noel Hotel Green Vanessa Noel Hotel Green

Shoe designers
Shoe brands
American debutantes
American fashion businesspeople
American fashion designers
American hoteliers
Cornell University alumni
Debutantes of the International Debutante Ball
Living people
People from Bryn Mawr, Pennsylvania
Agnes Irwin School alumni
1961 births